Matheus de Mello Costa (born 26 January 1995) is a Brazilian football player who plays for Marítimo as a centre back.

References

External links

1995 births
Living people
Brazilian footballers
Brazilian expatriate footballers
Association football defenders
Segunda Divisão players
Liga Portugal 2 players
Real S.C. players
Leixões S.C. players
F.C. Vizela players
C.S. Marítimo players
Brazilian expatriate sportspeople in Portugal
Expatriate footballers in Portugal